Garden Homes Historic District may refer to:

Garden Homes Historic District (Chicago, Illinois), listed on the NRHP in Chicago, Illinois
Garden Homes Historic District (Milwaukee, Wisconsin), listed on the NRHP in Milwaukee County, Wisconsin